Not the be confused with F-14 Tomcat (pinball)

F-14 Tomcat is a 2001 action video game released for the Game Boy Advance developed by Virtucraft and published by Majesco.

Reception

F-14 Tomcat received mixed reviews from critics. The game holds a 67% rating on Metacritic. 

IGN rated the game a 6 of 10, stating "...what's here is cool, if a bit vanilla. Controls are tight, graphics are clean, the missions are challenging, and the link cable mode works like a champ. But this game is only good in single shots due to the fact that the missions don't offer any variety".

GameZone rated the game a 4.5 of 10 praising the sound and difficulty while criticizing the gameplay, graphics and multi-player.

References

Combat flight simulators
Game Boy Advance games
Game Boy Advance-only games
Majesco Entertainment games
2001 video games
Video games developed in the United Kingdom